Grass is the tenth studio album by Keller Williams. It was released in 2006.

Background
Grass is a jam rock record. Keller is accompanied by The Keels, a husband and wife duo named Larry and Jenny Keel. On this album, Larry Keel, Keller's childhood friend, plays lead guitar, Jenny Keel plays bass, and Keller plays rhythm guitar.

The album features covers of songs by Tom Petty, Pink Floyd, the Yonder Mountain String Band and The Grateful Dead.

Track listing
 Goof Balls 
 Another Brick in the Wall
 Mary Jane's Last Breakdown
 Stunt Double 
 New Horizons
 Loser
 Crater in the Backyard 
 Dupree's Diamond Blues
 Local 
 I'm Just Here to Get My Baby Out of Jail

Personnel
Mark Berger – Package Design, Layout Design  
Jeff Covert – Producer, Engineer, Mixing  
Jenny Keel – Bass, Vocals  
Larry Keel – Guitar, Vocals  
Charlie Pilzer – Mastering  
Keller Williams – Banjo, Vocals, Guitar (12 String), Photography, Help

References

2006 albums
Keller Williams albums